The 1998 Adelaide Rams season was the Adelaide Rams' second and final season as a rugby league club. They competed in the first season of the National Rugby League.

The club was again coached by Rod Reddy and captained by Kerrod Walters. However, after the Rams lost nine of their first ten games, coach Reddy and the entire coaching staff were sacked by the Rams' administration. Reddy was replaced by former Perth Reds coach Dean Lance.

Results
In June after numerous financial disagreements with the South Australian Cricket Association (SACA) who at the time owned the Adelaide Oval, the club changed home grounds to the smaller, 16,000 capacity Hindmarsh Stadium, a soccer specific venue which was better suited to a rugby league field than the Adelaide Oval was. The Rams celebrated the move with a record 52–0 win over the Balmain Tigers.

The club went on to win six of their last fourteen games after the arrival of Dean Lance's, enough to avoid the wooden spoon awarded to the team finishing lowest on the competition ladder. Their overall results were comparable to those of their first season, coming fourth last in the 20–team competition. Appo broke several team records in his 14 games with the Rams.

The Adelaide Rams last home game in the penultimate round of the season saw a 36–0 thrashing at the hands of the finals bound North Sydney Bears in front of 7,035 fans on 15 August 1998.

Throughout the 1998 season, the Rams attempted to build a stronger supporter base in order to avoid removal from the competition in 1999 or 2000. However, with the team's lack of on-field success, plus the success of other Adelaide-based sports teams who won national championships in 1997 and/or 1998 including the Adelaide Crows (AFL), Adelaide 36ers (NBL) and Adelaide Thunderbirds (netball), saw average home attendances dropped by more than half (51.3%) from the previous years 15,330 to just 7,472 over the course of the season.

Ladder

Players

The demise of three clubs from the Super League and ARL (Western Reds and Hunter Mariners (SL), and South Queensland Crushers (ARL)) saw some player re-shuffling, and brought Noel Goldthorpe, Tony Iro and Matt Daylight to the Adelaide club.

References

Adelaide Rams
Adelaide Rams
Australian rugby league club seasons